Tundra is a 1936 drama film directed by Norman Dawn and featuring Merrill McCormick, Frank Baker and Earl Dwire. Originally the film was backed by Universal Pictures, but it was dropped when Carl Laemmle lost control of the studio. Production and distribution was then taken over by the independent Burroughs-Tarzan Pictures. Seven months of location shooting took place in Alaska. The film's sets were designed by the art director Charles Clague. Footage from the film was later re-used for the 1949 RKO release Arctic Fury.

Cast
Alfred Delcambre as Dr. Jason Barlow 
Merrill McCormick as Mack - The Trapper 
Jack Santos as Kuyuk - Eskimo from Noonak
Frank Baker as White Man from Noonak
Earl Dwire as Trading Post Keeper
Wally Howes as Trapper
Elsie Duran as Sayuk's Mother
Bertha Maldanado as Sayuk - Eskimo Child
Frazer Acosta as Umnak - Sayuk's Father

References

External links

1936 drama films
American drama films
Films directed by Norman Dawn
American black-and-white films
1930s English-language films
1930s American films